Malva is a municipality located in the province of Zamora, Castile and León, Spain. According to the 2012 census (INE), the municipality has a population of 167 inhabitants.

Geography 
Located in south of the natural reserve of Lagunas de Villafáfila, Malva is 17 km far from Toro, 33 from Zamora and 83 from Valladolid.

See also
List of municipalities in Zamora

References

External links

 Malva official website

Municipalities of the Province of Zamora